Palmstrøm is a Norwegian surname. Notable people with the surname include:

Finn Palmstrøm (1903–1987), Norwegian jurist
Henrik Palmstrøm (1900–1998), Norwegian actuary and statistician
Rolf Palmstrøm (1893–1975), Norwegian Army officer

Norwegian-language surnames